Iacopo is a given name, form of Jacopo, an Italian variation of Giacomo. May also refer to:

Iacopo II Appiani (1400–1441), the lord of Piombino from 1405 until 1441
Iacopo III Appiani (1422–1474), Prince of Piombino of the Appiani dynasty in the Renaissance
Iacopo IV Appiani (1459–1510), Italian condottiero and lord of Piombino of the Appiani dynasty in the Renaissance
Iacopo V Appiani (1480–1545), the lord of Piombino of the Appiani dynasty from 1511 until his death
Iacopo Balestri (born 1975), Italian footballer
Iacopo Jacomelli, Italian singer of 1940s
Iacopo La Rocca (born 1984), Italian football defender
Iacopo Rusticucci, 13th century Florentine politician
Vitaliano di Iacopo Vitaliani, Paduan nobleman who lived in the late 13th century around the time of Giotto and Dante

Italian masculine given names